Bob or Bobby Harris may refer to:

Entertainment
 Bob Harris (radio presenter) (born 1946), "Whispering" Bob Harris, British radio and TV presenter
 Bob Harris (sportscaster) (born 1942), American sports broadcaster
 Bob Harris (musician) (1943–2001), American jazz pianist, keyboardist and arranger
 Bobby Harris (musician), founder of the Dazz Band
 J. Robert Harris (1925–2000), U.S. composer of the 1967 Spider-Man television series theme
 Bob Harris (writer) (born 1963), American political commentator and writer
 Robert S. Harris, video game programmer

Sports
 Bob Harris (baseball) (1915–1989), American baseball player
 Bob Harris (basketball) (1927–1977), American basketball player
 Bob Harris (footballer) (born 1987), Scottish footballer
 Bob Harris (snooker player) (born 1956)
 Bobby Harris (born 1983), American football player

Fiction
 Bob Harris (character), fictional character in the movie Lost in Translation

See also
 Robert Harris (disambiguation)